Four Brothers is a 2005 American action film directed by John Singleton. The film stars Mark Wahlberg, Tyrese Gibson, André Benjamin and Garrett Hedlund as four adopted brothers who set out to avenge the murder of their adoptive mother. The film was shot in Detroit, Michigan and the Greater Toronto Area. It has been described as blaxploitation-influenced. Released on August 12, 2005, the film received mixed reviews from critics and grossed $92 million worldwide.

Plot
An elderly woman, Evelyn Mercer, is murdered at a convenience store in Highland Park, Michigan when a robbery occurs that results in the death of the store clerk, and Evelyn was left as the one and only witness. The incident brings her four adoptive sons back home to Detroit, Michigan to find out what happened. The oldest is a lifelong criminal, hot-tempered Bobby; the second oldest is family man and Union construction worker Jeremiah; the third oldest is an ex-hustler and former US Marine, Angel; and the youngest is aspiring rock musician Jack.

Originally under the impression the crime was a simple robbery gone wrong, the brothers chase down and interrogate a false witness to the police, after which the brothers discover that the robbery was a cover for a hit put out on Evelyn. The brothers track down the pair of hired guns who shot and killed Evelyn, and after refusing to give up any information, the two hitmen are executed by the enraged Bobby and Angel. The next day, Detroit Police Lieutenant Green and Detective Fowler confront the brothers about the murders. While the brothers deny involvement, Lieutenant Green warns them that their interference with Evelyn's case is ill-advised and that it will put them in over their heads.

After confronting Jeremiah about the revelation of his failing business and benefiting from Evelyn's life insurance, Jeremiah informs his brothers that his construction company was failing precisely because he was not getting involved with gang lord Victor Sweet and that for a project to succeed he had to pay off the right people, which he initially failed to do. In his effort to restore his business and relieve pressure on himself, he tried to pay off Sweet's henchmen. As for the life insurance, Jeremiah explains that the money went directly to him for his daughters, because he paid all of Evelyn's bills while the other brothers were not around. Sweet's men attack the brothers; Jack is shot during the attack and subsequent gunfight, and dies shortly after. Bobby and Angel manage to fend off and kill the gunmen. Bobby finds one of the gunmen still alive and questions him about who sent them, confirming it was Sweet.

Lieutenant Green arrives and informs them that Evelyn filed a police report regarding Victor Sweet and his involvement in Jeremiah's affairs, and his partner, Detective Fowler, passed that report on to Sweet. Green warns them to stay out of the matter and let him handle Fowler, and then they will work together on Sweet. Later at a bar, Green asks Fowler about Fowler seeing Evelyn a week before she was killed and asks him, "Why didn't you tell me that? Don't you think that that's relevant to a murder investigation?" Fowler simply responds, "I didn't tell you because it wasn't relevant at all". Fowler then lies and says the police report that Evelyn filed was given to another department to handle, though Green already knows that Fowler gave the report to Sweet. Realizing that Fowler is a crooked cop, Green attacks Fowler with a pool stick and orders Fowler to hand in his badge. After they walk out of the bar, Fowler shoots and kills Green and calls into dispatch claiming two Black assailants had fired upon Green.

The remaining brothers devise a plan to buy Victor Sweet off with the $400,000 from their mother's life insurance. Arriving at Fowler's, Angel subdues him. Jeremiah goes to meet Sweet while Angel's girlfriend, Sofi, heads to the police station, where she tells them that Angel is planning to kill a police officer. Hearing the sirens in the distance, Fowler believes they are coming for Angel, until Angel opens his jacket revealing a wire. Angel claims the whole conversation was taped, including Fowler's admission that he killed Green. The police arrive at Fowler's in full force, at which point Fowler gets the upper hand on Angel. With his gun pointed at Angel's head, Fowler tells the officers outside to back off, and despite telling him they are there to rescue him, Fowler opens fire on the officers, who kill him.

Meanwhile, at frozen-over Lake St. Clair, Jeremiah meets with Sweet, who reveals that he intends to kill him. Then Jeremiah reveals that the $400,000 is to pay off Sweet's henchmen, who are already embittered towards him because of his blatant mistreatment of them, in exchange for killing Sweet. Sweet angrily demands to know who will be the one to kill him, just as Bobby shows up. Bobby and Sweet brawl, during which Bobby uses his hockey playing skills to get the upper hand, knocking Sweet unconscious. His former henchmen seal his fate, dropping him into a hole carved in the ice.

The three brothers, taken into police custody, are beaten in an attempt to make them confess to the murder of Sweet but give up nothing. Back home, they set about repairing their mother's house and continuing their lives together.

Cast
 Mark Wahlberg as Bobby Mercer, the oldest of the Mercers. 
 Tyrese Gibson as Angel Mercer, Bobby's younger adoptive brother, ex-Marine and hustler.
 André Benjamin as Jeremiah Mercer, Bobby's younger adoptive brother, family man and construction worker 
 Garrett Hedlund as Jack Mercer, Bobby's youngest adoptive brother, youngest member, and aspiring rocker musician
 Terrence Howard as Lieutenant Green
 Josh Charles as Detective Fowler
 Sofía Vergara as Sofi, Angel's girlfriend
 Chiwetel Ejiofor as Victor Sweet
 Fionnula Flanagan as Evelyn Mercer, the adoptive mother of Bobby, Jeremiah, Angel & Jack
 Taraji P. Henson as Camille Mercer, Jeremiah's wife
 Reiya West Downs as Daniela Mercer, Jeremiah & Camille's first daughter
 Riele West Downs as Amelia Mercer, Jeremiah & Camille's second daughter
 Kenneth Welsh as Robert Bradford
 Barry Shabaka Henley as Councilman Douglas
 Jernard Burks as Evan
 Lyriq Bent as Damian
 Adam Beach as Chief

Music
The music for the film includes, in a repeating refrain, the song "I Wish It Would Rain", written by Barrett Strong and Norman Whitfield, and performed by The Temptations, courtesy of Motown Records.

Other music includes the following:
 "Somebody to Love" by Jefferson Airplane
 "Trouble Man" by Marvin Gaye
 "Cloud Nine" by The Temptations 
 "What U Gon' Do" by Lil Jon and The East Side Boyz (feat. Lil Scrappy) 
 "Dancing Machine" by The Jackson Five
 "'T' Plays It Cool" by Marvin Gaye
 "Take A Look Around" by The Temptations
 "Shake Me, Wake Me (When It's Over)" by The Four Tops
 "Shallow" by Porcupine Tree
 "Get Back" by Subway to Venus
 "Oh Boy" by Eastside Chedda Boyz
 "Plastic Jesus" by Ed Rush and George Cromarty
 "Ride Out" by Blade Icewood
 "Papa Was a Rollin' Stone" by The Temptations
 "Inner City Blues (Make Me Wanna Holler)" by Marvin Gaye
 "Got That Fire" by Mycale
 "Dum Da Dum" by 2Xl
 "Jesus Walks" by Kanye West (containing a sample of "Walk With Me" performed by The Arc Choir)
 "In The Thick" by The Co-Stars
 "Motown Flava" by Spooky and The Chunk
 "After Dark" by The Co-Stars
 "Cleo's Apartment" by Marvin Gaye
 "Smiling Faces Sometimes" by The Undisputed Truth
 "Do It Baby" by The Miracles
 "Knucklehead" by Grover Washington Jr.
 "World's Gonna End" by Josh Rifkin, Ben Levine, Chris Steele, and Dave Hemann
 "Brother's Gonna Work It Out" by Willie Hutch
 "Für Elise" (uncredited), written by Ludwig van Beethoven

Release
Four Brothers was released in the United States on August 12, 2005.

Reception

Box office 
Four Brothers grossed $74.5 million in the United States and Canada, and $18 million in other territories, for a worldwide total of $92.5 million, against a budget of $30 million.

It made $21.2 million on its first weekend, topping the box office.

Critical response 
On the review aggregator Rotten Tomatoes, the film holds an approval rating of 52% based on 133 reviews, with an average rating of 5.7/10. The site's critics consensus reads: "Despite striking a believable rapport among its principal actors, Four Brothers overwhelms with ultra-violent, vigilante-glorifying action and devolves into too many fractured, insubstantial thematic directions." At Metacritic the film has a weighted average score of 49 out of 100, based on 31 critics, indicating "mixed or average reviews". Audiences polled by CinemaScore gave the film an average grade of "B+" on an A+ to F scale.

Sequel
An article written in 2010 suggested that Paramount Pictures was developing a sequel for the film, with Mark Wahlberg returning to reprise his role. It would be written by David Elliot and Paul Lovett.

In a 2020 post on his Instagram page, Tyrese Gibson claimed a script for a sequel, Five Brothers, is in the works.

See also 

 The Sons of Katie Elder: A 1965 American Western film with a similar premise.
 Big B: A Malayalam language film directed by Amal Neerad that was an unofficial remake of this film.

References

External links
 
 
 
 

2005 films
2005 action thriller films
2000s crime drama films
2000s mystery films
American action thriller films
American crime drama films
American mystery films
Fictional portrayals of the Detroit Police Department
Films about brothers
Films about families
American films about revenge
Films set in 2004
Films set in Detroit
Hood films
African-American films
Thanksgiving in films
American vigilante films
Di Bonaventura Pictures films
Paramount Pictures films
Films directed by John Singleton
Films produced by Lorenzo di Bonaventura
Films scored by David Arnold
Films shot in Detroit
2000s vigilante films
2005 drama films
Fiction about murder
2000s English-language films
2000s American films